The Nimrod Ross House is a historic cottage in Lincoln, Nebraska. Probably built by carpenter Henry Brueckner in 1903, it belonged to Nimrod and Ellen Ross from 1904 to 1917. Nimrod Ross was a freedman, who was born a slave in Tennessee in 1863 and became one of the first African-American police officers in Lincoln, Nebraska in the early 1900s. The house has been listed on the National Register of Historic Places since June 25, 1999.

References

African-American history of Nebraska	
National Register of Historic Places in Lincoln, Nebraska
Houses completed in 1903
1903 establishments in Nebraska